Bar Aftab or Baraftab (Persian: بَر آفتاب) may refer to:

Chaharmahal and Bakhtiari Province
Bar Aftab-e Khonk, a village in Lordgegan County
Bar Aftab-e Milas, a village in Lordgegan County
Bar Aftab-e Sardasht, a village in Lordgegan County
Bar Aftab-e Shidan, a village in Lordgegan County
Bar Aftab-e Shirani, a village in Lordgegan County

Fars Province
Bar Aftab, Fars, a village in Mamasani County
Bar Aftab-e Zirdu, a village in Rostam County

Hormozgan Province
Bar Aftab, Hormozgan, a village in Hajjiabad County

Ilam Province
Baraftab-e Bi, a village in Shirvan and Chardaval County
Baraftab-e Chalab Zard, a village in Shirvan and Chardaval County
Baraftab-e Larini, a village in Shirvan and Chardaval County
Baraftab-e Meleh Maran, a village in Shirvan and Chardaval County

Isfahan Province

Kerman Province

Kermanshah Province
Bar Aftab, Kermanshah
Baraftab, Gilan-e Gharb, a village in Gilan-e Gharb County
Bar Aftab-e Golin, a village in Sarpol-e Zahrab County

Khuzestan Province

Andika County
Bar Aftab-e Akbar, a village in Andika County
Bar Aftab-e Chel Khorasan, a village in Andika County
Bar Aftab-e Heydarqoli, a village in Andika County

Bagh-e Malek County
Bar Aftab, Bagh-e Malek, a village in Bagh-e Malek County

Dezful County
Bar Aftab-e Olya, a village in Dezful County
Bar Aftab-e Sofla, Khuzestan, a village in Dezful County

Izeh County
Bar Aftab, Izeh, a village in Izeh County
Bar Aftab-e Fazl, a village in Izeh County
Bar Aftab-e Ali Momen, a village in Izeh County
Bar Aftab-e Amanallah, a village in Izeh County
Bar Aftab-e Chah Dowpowk, a village in Izeh County
Bar Aftab-e Kashkeli, a village in Izeh County
Bar Aftab-e Rezai, a village in Izeh County
Bar Aftab-e Sadat, a village in Izeh County
Bar Aftab-e Zafari, a village in Izeh County

Lali County
Bar Aftab-e Sipeh, a village in Lali County

Kohgiluyeh and Boyer-Ahmad Province
Baraftab-e Poshtkuh, a village in Basht County
Bar Aftab-e Silab, a village in Boyer-Ahmad County
Bar Aftab-e Tahlivan, a village in Boyer-Ahmad County
Deh-e Bar Aftab (disambiguation), a village in Boyer-Ahmad County
Bar Aftab-e Kochala, a village in Charam County
Bar Aftab-e Sarfaryab, a village in Charam County
Bar Aftab-e Ali Karami, a village in Dana County
Bar Aftab-e Jalaleh, a village in Dana County
Bar Aftab-e Khorbel, a village in Gachsaran County
Bar Aftab, Kohgiluyeh, a village in Kohgiluyeh County
Bar Aftab-e Emam Reza, a village in Kohgiluyeh County
Bar Aftab-e Sefid, a village in Kohgiluyeh County
Bar Aftab-e Sofla, Kohgiluyeh and Boyer-Ahmad, a village in Kohgiluyeh County

Lorestan Province
Bar Aftab, Dorud, a village in Dorud County
Bar Aftab-e Deraz, a village in Dorud County
Kheyrabad-e Olya, Lorestan, a village in Dowreh County
Qasemali-ye Bar Aftab, a village in Dowreh County
Bar Aftab-e Humeh, a village in Khorramabad County
Bar Aftab-e Ali Asgar, a village in Khorramabad County
Baraftab-e Seyd Mohammad, a village in Kuhdasht County
Baraftab, Pol-e Dokhtar, a village in Pol-e Dokhtar County
Bar Aftab-e Ghazal, a village in Pol-e Dokhtar County